Mendolaspis is an extinct genus of trilobites. It lived during the Arenig stage of the Ordovician Period, approximately 478 to 471 million years ago.

References

Raphiophoridae
Asaphida genera
Ordovician trilobites
Fossils of Norway
Fossils of Argentina